The official discography of Buckcherry, a rock band from Anaheim, California, includes nine studio albums, one live album, one video album, thirty-two singles and thirty-eight music videos.

Buckcherry is a Grammy-nominated hard rock band from Anaheim, California, formed in 1995. The band released two albums, Buckcherry (1999) and Time Bomb (2001), before dissolving in the summer of 2002. In 2005, lead vocalist Josh Todd and lead guitarist Keith Nelson formed a new band using the Buckcherry moniker and released a new album on October 17, 2005, 15. It contained Buckcherry's biggest crossover hits to date, "Crazy Bitch", and their first Billboard Hot 100 top ten hit, "Sorry". Their fourth album, Black Butterfly, was released on September 16, 2008. Their fifth album, All Night Long, was released on August 3, 2010. Buckcherry released their sixth album, Confessions, on February 19, 2013. Their seventh studio album, Rock 'n' Roll, was released on August 21, 2015.

Albums

Studio albums

Live albums

Compilation albums

Extended plays

Singles

Promotional singles

Music videos

Soundtrack appearances

Video albums

References

Discographies of American artists
Rock music group discographies